Parkab (also Romanized as Parkāb) is a village in Howmeh Rural District, in the Central District of Sarab County, East Azerbaijan Province, Iran. At the 2006 census, its population was 97, in 21 families.

References 

Populated places in Sarab County